James Hay Irons (30 October 1874 – 1957) was a Scottish footballer who played as a wing half.

Career
Born in Scoonie and raised in Cathcart, Irons played club football mainly for Queen's Park, winning the Glasgow Cup in 1898 and featuring on the losing side in the 1900 Scottish Cup Final. He also played briefly for Morton and Abercorn before retiring from the professional game in his mid-20s.

He made one international appearance for Scotland in 1900 against Wales and had also been selected for the Glasgow FA'a annual challenge match against Sheffield a year earlier.

References

1874 births
1957 deaths
Date of death missing
Scottish footballers
Scotland international footballers
Scottish Football League players
Queen's Park F.C. players
Abercorn F.C. players
Greenock Morton F.C. players
Pollokshields Athletic F.C. players
Association football wing halves
Footballers from Fife
People from Cathcart
Footballers from Glasgow